Roland Reed may refer to:

Roland D. Reed (1894–1972), American film editor, producer and director
Roland W. Reed (1864–1934), American photographer

See also
Roland Reid (born 1978) Scottish rugby union player